Zabranjena ljubav (lit. "Forbidden Love", commonly abbreviated to ZLJ) is a Croatian daytime soap opera about the lives and loves of both young and older characters, focused on Zagreb, capital city of Croatia. Actors Mario Valentić, Antonija Šola, Nada Rocco, Dejan Marcikić and Anita Berisha (last one with some months of break) were the only remaining original cast members until the final episode.

About show 
The soap tackles controversial issues, such as incest, rape, homosexuality, adultery, and deadly diseases. The viewers of this soap are varied, ranging from small children to senior citizens.

Zabranjena ljubav is a remake of Australian soap opera Sons and Daughters, initially based on that serial's original story and character outlines, before diverging as the new series progressed.

In April 2008, RTL Televizija announced that the highly popular soap opera would end its run after 4 years that fall in its time slot 7:30 PM. A total of 805 episodes were filmed, but on the 4 April 2008, channel RTL canceled broadcasting after 759 episodes. The rest of episodes were shown only in Autumn 2011, with the series finale aired on November 3, 2011.

With 805 episodes, it is the longest TV series ever filmed in former Yugoslavia.

History
The original story begins by introducing a handsome 22-year-old Danijel Lončar (Zoran Pribičević) coming home to Zagreb, on his 22nd birthday, after losing his job in Italy. At the railway station, he bumps into a beautiful girl. They both feel immediate attraction. Danijel doesn’t even get the chance to ask for her name as they are greeted by their friends and family.

The girl is Petra Novak (Anita Berisha) who also returned home, after studying photography in London, funny enough, on a present-day she also celebrates her 22nd birthday.

It soon transpires that Danijel and Petra were twins separated at birth. Danijel had initially been raised by the wise Nada Horvat (Nada Rocco) before returning to his father Josip Lončar (Drazen Mikulić), and Petra raised by her mother Viktorija Novak (Sanja Vejnović) who had married into money to a rich aristocrate widower Stjepan Novak (Velimir Čokljat).

The parents of the twins had each married other people and raised families which had other adult children. The Lončar family comprised Danijel's father Josip Lončar, a construction worker; and Josip's wife Biserka Lončar (Vanja Matujec), a warm-hearted, down-to-earth housewife. Their children were Iva Lončar (Marija Kobić) and Matija (Filip Riđički), Iva had just started a romantic involvement with Igor Carević (Dejan Marcikić) and Matija started seeing his class member Lana Kos (Petra Kurtela). Petra had grown up with her mother Viktorija (Sanja Vejnović), Viktorija's husband Stjepan  who was a successful wineyard owner and businessman, and Stjepan's son from an earlier marriage, the spiteful Borna Novak (Mario Valentić).

After Danijel's investigation into Petra's whereabouts, he slowly enters the world of the powerful Novak family by landing a job as a gardener, not knowing he is working for his biological mother, nor that he has fallen in love with his own sister.

Other major characters include Lidija Bauer (Katija Zubčić) who has always had strong feelings for Stjepan, but who stepped away out of respect towards the family and her children. Lidija has two children of her own: the spoiled and stubborn teenager Tina Bauer (Antonija Šola) and the good-natured medical student Leon Bauer (Mario Mohenski, later Marin Knežević), who was betrothed to Petra at Viktorija's instigation only for the wedding to be cancelled after a revelation about his homosexuality. Viktorija's best friend, the dizzy socialite Stela Vidak (Matija Prskalo), was introduced as a minor figure during the show's early days as someone to whom Viktorija could recite expository dialogue about her latest scheme to, but soon emerged as a key character.

Series overview

Cast

2008 Cast

Recurring cast members

Departed cast members

References
Zabranjena ljubav, official website 
Zabranjena ljubav, unofficial website blog

External links 
 

2000s Croatian television series
Croatian television soap operas
2004 Croatian television series debuts
2008 Croatian television series endings
Non-Australian television series based on Australian television series
RTL (Croatian TV channel) original programming